Limnaecia tyriarcha is a moth in the family Cosmopterigidae. It is found in India.

References

Natural History Museum Lepidoptera generic names catalog

Limnaecia
Moths described in 1919
Taxa named by Edward Meyrick
Moths of Asia